Leavin' the Game on Luckie Street is a live album recording by American singer-songwriter Butch Walker and his band the Let's-Go-Out-Tonites!. The concert was recorded live April 20, 2007, at The Tabernacle in Atlanta, Georgia. Initially released only online, the album was eventually released on CD February 14, 2008, simultaneously offered as a free download at his website and select online partners (including the short-lived social media networking website FriendsOrEnemies.com), and soon after on DVD March 17, 2008.

CD track list 
Disc 1

Disc 2

DVD content

Setlist
Intro
Uncomfortably Numb
Alicia Amnesia
#1 Summer Jam
Too Famous to Get Dressed
Maybe It's Just Me
Bethamphetamine
Ladies and Gentlemen, the Let's-Go-Out-Tonites!
Don't Move
Indie Queen
Laid/Taste of Red
Far Away From Close
Over Your Head
Race Cars & Goth Rock
Mixtape
Stateline
Sober
Joan
Cigarette Lighter Love Song
Best Thing You Never Had
Hot Girls in Good Moods
Born to Run (Bruce Springsteen)
Lights Out
Canyons

Credits

Personnel
Butch Walker & the Let's-Go-Out-Tonites!:
Butch Walker – lead vocals, guitar, piano
Darren Dodd – drums, backing vocals
Wes Flowers – keyboards, backing vocals
Randy Michael – bass
Jamie Arentzen – guitar

Crew
Mitch Lerner – front of house, tour manager
Brock Hogan – lighting design
Billy Hempel – stage manager
Andy Hosoi – merchandise

Filmed
Tabernacle, Atlanta, Georgia. April 20, 2007

Executive Producer
Chris Unck, El! Smacko! Productions

Producers
Chris Unck, El! Smacko! Productions
Carl Diebold, Sincera Entertainment
Ryan Lassan, Autumn Addict

Directors
Tim Daust, Reelmind Studios

References

2008 albums
Butch Walker albums